Seth Christopher Petruzelli (born December 3, 1979) is an American retired mixed martial artist, kickboxer, professional wrestler and entrepreneur. Petruzelli competed in the Heavyweight and Light Heavyweight divisions for the UFC, WEC, EliteXC, King of the Cage, BAMMA, and Bellator. On October 21, 2015, Petruzelli signed with professional wrestling promotion WWE, to work at their Performance Center as a striking coach. Currently, he wrestles for Major League Wrestling.

Background
Petruzelli was born in Cape Coral, Florida and is a native of Fort Myers, Florida. He began training in karate at the age of seven and continued on training through high school. Petruzelli attended Bishop Verot High School as a freshman before transferring to Mariner High School to take advantage of the school's elite wrestling team. He also played football and ran in track and field. Petruzelli was a three-sport letterman all four years of high school and was also all-state center in football. Petruzelli was offered a scholarship to wrestle and play football in college but ended up turning professional in mixed martial arts right out of high school. He holds a 3rd degree black belt in Shitō-ryū karate and a Black belt in Brazilian jiu-jitsu. He eventually went on to study psychology at the University of Central Florida.

Mixed martial arts career
Petruzelli was a member of the cast of the Ultimate Fighting Championship's The Ultimate Fighter 2 as a Heavyweight. He was eliminated in the semi-finals by Brad Imes after having defeated Dan Christison by unanimous decision in an elimination bout. He later had the opportunity to fight in the UFC in 2006, but was cut after losses to Matt Hamill and Wilson Gouveia.

EliteXC controversy
On October 4, 2008, at EliteXC: Heat, he defeated Kimbo Slice in 14 seconds by TKO. He was offered the fight on short notice after UFC Hall of Famer Ken Shamrock received a cut over his left eye in pre-fight practice and was forced to back out. Petruzelli was also outweighed by around 30 lbs. as he weighed in at the Light Heavyweight threshold of 205.5 and Slice at 234.5 lbs.

On October 10, 2008, six days after the fight with Slice, he told the radio show The Monsters in the Morning:

EliteXC Vice President Jared Shaw immediately denied what could be perceived as them trying to fix the fight, and Petruzelli later clarified his statement telling respectively Yahoo! Sports and FiveOuncesofPain.com:

On October 23, 2008, the Florida Department of Business and Professional Regulation concluded its investigation of the bout and found no wrongdoing.

2008–2010
In December 2008, Petruzelli opened "The Jungle MMA & Fitness" (http://jungleorlando.com) with Tom Lawlor and Mike Lee in Orlando, Fl.
On August 22, 2009, Petruzelli fought in the Art Of Fighting 4 at the USF Sundome in Florida.

Petruzelli was expected to face MMA pioneer and former King of Pancrase Ken Shamrock on March 6, 2010 at an event called International Unlimited Fighting: The Return of Buluc but the fight was called off.

Return to the UFC
Petruzelli returned to the UFC at UFC 116 to face UFC newcomer Ricardo Romero. Despite having dominated the initial stages of the fight, Petruzelli lost by armbar submission and was visibly hurt.

Petruzelli stated via Twitter that his arm was not broken and it had just popped. He was given another fight by the UFC, and expressed excitement to face Tito Ortiz or Matt Hamill depending on whoever loses the fight. On November 13, he faced Karlos Vemola at UFC 122 in Oberhausen, Germany. He lost the fight via TKO (strikes) at 3:46 of the first round and was released from the promotion after dropping to 0-4 in the UFC.

Post-UFC Career
Petruzelli faced Dave Mewborn on April 22 serving as the Main Event for World Extreme Fighting 46 at the UCF Arena in Orlando Florida. He defeated Mewborn by TKO at 3:06 of the first round.

Bellator Fighting Championships
Petruzelli made his Bellator debut against Ricco Rodriguez at Bellator 48. He won the fight via KO in the first round. After the fight Petruzelli was rewarded with a BJJ black belt under Thiago Domingues (a De La Riva Blackbelt).

He returned in 2013 as a participant in the Bellator Season 7 Light Heavyweight tournament. He lost to Jacob Noe via TKO in the opening round at Bellator 85.

Petruzelli competed in Bellator's Light Heavyweight summer series tournament on Spike.  He faced Muhammed Lawal in the opening round of a 4-man tournament at Bellator 96 on June 19, 2013 and lost via knockout in the first round. Following the loss Petruzelli announced his retirement from MMA.

Championships and accomplishments
Ultimate Fighting Championship
Fight of the Night (Two times)
Ultimate Warrior Challenge
Ultimate Warrior Challenge
Knockout of the Night

Kickboxing record

|-  bgcolor="#FFBBBB"
| 2012-09-08 || Loss ||align=left| Xavier Vigney || K-1 World Grand Prix 2012 in Los Angeles || Los Angeles, California, US || TKO (right knee) || 2 || 1:17 || 0-3
|-
|-  bgcolor="#FFBBBB"
| 2004-05-30 || Loss ||align=left| Aleksandr Pitchkounov || Kyokushin vs K-1 2004 All Out Battle || Tokyo, Japan || TKO (corner stoppage) || 2 || 2:18 || 0-2
|-
|-  bgcolor="#FFBBBB"
| 2004-03-27 || Loss ||align=left| Bob Sapp || K-1 World Grand Prix 2004 in Saitama || Saitama, Japan || TKO (arm injury) || 1 || 0:57 || 0-1
|-
| colspan=9 | Legend:

Mixed martial arts record

|-
| Loss
| align=center| 14–8
| Muhammed Lawal
| KO (punch)
| Bellator 96
| 
| align=center| 1
| align=center| 1:35
| Thackerville, Oklahoma, United States
| 
|-
| Loss
| align=center| 14–7
| Jacob Noe
| TKO (punches)
| Bellator 85
| 
| align=center| 1
| align=center| 2:51
| Irvine, California, United States
| 
|-
| Win
| align=center| 14–6
| Ricco Rodriguez
| KO (punches)
| Bellator 48
| 
| align=center| 1
| align=center| 4:21
| Uncasville, Connecticut, United States
| 
|-
| Win
| align=center| 13–6
| Dave Mewborn
| TKO (punches)
| World Extreme Fighting 46
| 
| align=center| 1
| align=center| 3:06
| Orlando, Florida, United States
| 
|-
| Loss
| align=center| 12–6
| Karlos Vémola
| TKO (punches)
| UFC 122
| 
| align=center| 1
| align=center| 3:46
| Oberhausen, Germany
| 
|-
| Loss
| align=center| 12–5
| Ricardo Romero
| Submission (straight armbar)
| UFC 116
| 
| align=center| 2
| align=center| 3:05
| Las Vegas, Nevada, United States
| 
|-
| Win
| align=center| 12–4
| Ryan White
| Submission (armbar)
| BAMMA 3
| 
| align=center| 1
| align=center| 1:07
| Birmingham, England
| 
|-
| Win
| align=center| 11–4
| Chris Baten
| TKO (punches)
| Art of Fighting 4: Damage
| 
| align=center| 1
| align=center| 2:23
| Tampa, Florida, United States
| 
|-
| Win
| align=center| 10–4
| Kimbo Slice
| TKO (punches)
| EliteXC: Heat
| 
| align=center| 1
| align=center| 0:14
| Sunrise, Florida, United States
|
|-
| Win
| align=center| 9–4
| Sean Sallee
| TKO 
| Knight Fight
| 
| align=center| 1
| align=center| 2:58
| Orlando, Florida, United States
| 
|-
| Loss
| align=center| 8–4
| Wilson Gouveia
| Submission (guillotine choke)
| UFC Fight Night: Stevenson vs. Guillard
| 
| align=center| 2
| align=center| 0:39
| Las Vegas, Nevada, United States
| 
|-
| Win
| align=center| 8–3
| Bernard Rutherford
| KO (punches)
| Ultimate Warrior Challenge
| 
| align=center| 1
| align=center| 1:47
| Jacksonville, Florida, United States
| 
|-
| Loss
| align=center| 7–3
| Matt Hamill
| Decision (unanimous)
| UFC: Ortiz vs. Shamrock 3: The Final Chapter
| 
| align=center| 3
| align=center| 5:00
| Hollywood, Florida, United States
| 
|-
| Win
| align=center| 7–2
| Dan Severn
| Decision (unanimous)
| KOTC 32: Bringing Heat
| 
| align=center| 3
| align=center| 5:00
| Miami, Florida, United States
| 
|-
| Win
| align=center| 6–2
| Brian Hawkins
| TKO (punches)
| KOTC 21: Invasion
| 
| align=center| 1
| align=center| 2:21
| Albuquerque, New Mexico, United States
| 
|-
| Win
| align=center| 5–2
| Rocky Batastini
| TKO (punches)
| KOTC 18: Sudden Impact
| 
| align=center| 1
| align=center| 4:04
| Reno, Nevada, United States
| 
|-
| Win
| align=center| 4–2
| Mike Ward
| TKO (doctor stoppage)
| Cage Wars 1
| 
| align=center| 1
| align=center| 2:50
| Portsmouth, England
| 
|-
| Win
| align=center| 3–2
| Keith Fielder
| TKO (corner stoppage)
| RSF 6: Mayhem in Myers
| 
| align=center| 1
| align=center| 2:10
| Fort Myers, Florida, United States
| 
|-
| Win
| align=center| 2–2
| Victor Majuskaus
| TKO (slam and punches)
| WVF: Battlejax
| 
| align=center| 1
| align=center| 0:29
| Jacksonville, Florida, United States
| 
|-
| Loss
| align=center| 1–2
| Gan McGee
| Submission (heel hook)
| WEC 1
| 
| align=center| 1
| align=center| 1:25
| Lemoore, California, United States
| 
|-
| Loss
| align=center| 1–1
| Mario Neto
| Submission (rear-naked choke)
| World Vale Tudo Championship
| 
| align=center| 1
| align=center| 17:36
| Recife, Brazil
| 
|-
| Win
| align=center| 1–0
| Nate Robinson
| KO (punch)
| WVF: Battlejax
| 
| align=center| 1
| align=center| 1:29
| Jacksonville, Florida, United States
|

Personal life 
Petruzelli was married for around 4 years.  He and his first wife divorced after conflicts over business and his continuing to fight.  When he retired from fighting in 2013, he became engaged to Analia Romero.

References

External links 
Seth Petruzelli Official Bio
https://www.facebook.com/profile.php?id=1849444048
https://www.facebook.com/pages/Silverback-Seth-Petruzelli/146795278672784
https://www.twitter.com/silverbackseth
Seth Petruzelli Interview

1979 births
Living people
American male mixed martial artists
American people of Italian descent
Light heavyweight mixed martial artists
Heavyweight mixed martial artists
Mixed martial artists from Florida
Mixed martial artists utilizing Shitō-ryū
Mixed martial artists utilizing Brazilian jiu-jitsu
American male karateka
American male kickboxers
Kickboxers from Florida
Heavyweight kickboxers
American practitioners of Brazilian jiu-jitsu
People awarded a black belt in Brazilian jiu-jitsu
Ultimate Fighting Championship male fighters